"The Man Who Called Himself Jesus" is a song by English band Strawbs written by Dave Cousins. It appears on their album Strawbs. An alternative mix of the song may be found on the 2006 box set A Taste of Strawbs.

B-Side

The B-side track "Poor Jimmy Wilson" is also taken from the Strawbs album.

Personnel

Dave Cousins – lead vocals, acoustic guitar
Tony Hooper – backing vocals, acoustic guitar, percussion
Ron Chesterman – double bass

with

Richard Wilson – spoken introduction

Release history

External links
Lyrics to "The Man Who Called Himself Jesus" at Strawbsweb official site
Lyrics to "Poor Jimmy Wilson" at Strawbsweb official site

References
"The Man Who Called Himself Jesus" at Strawbsweb

Strawbs songs
1968 singles
Songs written by Dave Cousins
Song recordings produced by Gus Dudgeon
1968 songs
A&M Records singles